The Samsung Galaxy J1 (2016) (also called Galaxy Express 3 and Galaxy Amp 2) is an Android smartphone developed by Samsung Electronics and was released in January 2016.

Specifications

Hardware 
The J1 (2016) has a 4.5 inch Super AMOLED display. It is powered by an Speadtrum SC9830 SoC featuring a quad-core 1.3 GHz ARM Cortex-A7 CPU with 1 GB of RAM. It has 8 GB internal storage, Dual SIM functionality is not a for Dual models.

Software 
The J1 (2016) is shipped with Android 5.1.1 "Lollipop" and Samsung's TouchWiz user interface.

See also 
 Samsung Galaxy
 Samsung Galaxy J series

References

External links 

Android (operating system) devices
Samsung smartphones
Mobile phones introduced in 2016
Samsung Galaxy
Mobile phones with user-replaceable battery